Oded Elkayam (born February 9, 1988) is an Israeli footballer.

External links

1988 births
Living people
Israeli footballers
Hapoel Haifa F.C. players
Hapoel Ramat Gan F.C. players
Bnei Sakhnin F.C. players
Maccabi Haifa F.C. players
Hapoel Ironi Kiryat Shmona F.C. players
Maccabi Petah Tikva F.C. players
Hapoel Nof HaGalil F.C. players
Liga Leumit players
Israeli Premier League players
Israeli people of Moroccan-Jewish descent
Israel under-21 international footballers
Footballers from Haifa
Association football defenders